{{DISPLAYTITLE:C14H17NO3}}
The molecular formula C14H17NO3 (molar mass : 247.28 g/mol) may refer to :

 CX-546
 N-Ethoxycarbonyl-2-ethoxy-1,2-dihydroquinoline
 Fagaramide
 3',4'-Methylenedioxy-α-pyrrolidinopropiophenone